"You Surround Me" is a song by English synth-pop duo Erasure that was issued in November 1989 by Mute Records as the second single from the band's fourth studio album, Wild! (1989). Written by the duo's Vince Clarke and Andy Bell, it is a heavily synthesized ballad with a dramatic chorus featuring Bell's falsetto. Clarke has stated that this song was his attempt at writing a James Bond film theme. Upon release, "You Surround Me" became Erasure's tenth consecutive top 20 hit on the UK Singles Chart, peaking at #15. It reached #10 on the Irish singles chart, and became a top 40 hit in Germany, where it reached #38. The song was not released as a single in the United States.

B-sides
This release has become more notable for the B-sides that were included with "You Surround Me". First was a cover version of Cerrone's environmental anthem "Supernature". The song, also previously recorded by Lene Lovich, led to a collaboration between Erasure and Lovich for the song "Rage", which later appeared on a PETA benefit album. Erasure's recording was remixed by William Orbit and became a popular hit in dance clubs. Also included on the single as a B-side is "91 Steps", an instrumental with complex synthesizer programming and unusual time signature that, upon playing, may cause some listeners to think that the disc is skipping. The track utilises repeating cycles in which the first seven bars use a 7/4 time signature, followed by one bar in 3/4 time.

Critical reception
Ned Raggett from AllMusic declared "You Surround Me" as "another flat-out winner -- it's another slow ballad, but with big, echoing backing that adds a sense of extra theatricality." The Daily Vault's Michael R. Smith complimented it as "a techno ballad to die for and is just as intense as 'Drama'." He added, "It contains a cascading melody that simply glows. File this one under Overlooked Masterpieces." Paul Lester from Melody Maker wrote, "Another odd choice for a single, 'You Surround Me' has a hookline so slender it's scarcely visible to the naked ear, and a beat that, next to all the great house and hip hop records available at present, is just too weak to count." Chris Gerard from Metro Weekly named it "one of the duo's all-time great ballads", remarking that "it has real heart and feeling; it's unabashedly sentimental, but it feels completely genuine." Jaynie Senior from Number One described the song as "lush and fulsome". Christopher Smith from Talk About Pop Music viewed it as "a brooding number with Vince turning on the synths at maximum level while Andy remains in subdued restraint for the most part."

Music video
A music video was made to accompany the song. It features Clarke and Bell performing on a three-level circular stage set, with cityscapes superimposed at various points during the song through a mixture of chroma key and ordinary vision mixing.

Track listings

 7" single (MUTE99) / Cassette single (CMUTE99)
 "You Surround Me"
 "91 Steps"

 12" single (12MUTE99) / CD single (CDMUTE99)
 "You Surround Me" (Syrinx Mix)
 "Supernature"
 "91 Steps" (+24 Mix)

 Limited 12" single (L12MUTE99) / Limited CD single (LCDMUTE99)
 "You Surround Me" (Remix)
 "Supernature" (William Orbit Mix)
 "91 Steps" (6 Pianos Mix)

 Limited "Supernature" 12" single (XL12MUTE99)
 "Supernature" (Daniel Miller & Phil Legg Mix)
 "You Surround Me" (Gareth Jones Mix)
 "Supernature" (Mark Saunders Mix)

Charts

References

1989 singles
Erasure songs
Songs written by Vince Clarke
Songs written by Andy Bell (singer)
Song recordings produced by Gareth Jones
Song recordings produced by Mark Saunders
Electropop ballads
Mute Records singles
Sire Records singles
1989 songs